Jacob Michael Bischoff (born July 25, 1994) is an American professional ice hockey defenseman currently playing for the Henderson Silver Knights in the American Hockey League (AHL). He was drafted by the New York Islanders in the 2012 NHL Entry Draft.

Early life
Bischoff was born on June 25, 1994, in Cambridge, Minnesota, as the oldest child to parents Jackie Tok and Grant Bischoff. His father played ice hockey for the University of Minnesota and was drafted by the Minnesota North Stars after his freshman year. As a result, Bischoff was trained by his father from a young age. His mother later died when he was 16 and his father re-married to Tammi McLaughlin. Bischoff's step brother Blake McLaughlin also plays hockey and was drafted by the Anaheim Ducks in 2018.

Playing career
Bischoff played high school hockey in his native Minnesota with Grand Rapids High and parts of two seasons with the Omaha Lancers of the United States Hockey League (USHL) before committing and playing collegiate hockey for the University of Minnesota.

As an alternate captain with the Gophers, Bischoff completed a four-year collegiate career, having his most productive season in his senior year during the 2016–17 season, compiling 5 goals and 27 assists for 32 points in 38 games from the blueline. He was selected as the Big Ten Defensive Player of the Year.

Originally drafted out of high school by the New York Islanders in the seventh-round, 185th overall, of the 2012 NHL Entry Draft, Bischoff was signed to a two-year, entry-level contract with the club following his senior season with the Golden Gophers on March 29, 2017. He immediately joined the Islanders' AHL affiliate, the Bridgeport Sound Tigers for the remainder of the regular season, posting 3 points in 6 games.

On June 21, 2017, Bischoff was traded by the Islanders, along with Mikhail Grabovski and a pair of draft selections to the Vegas Golden Knights, in exchange for 2017 NHL Expansion Draft considerations. In joining the Golden Knights in their inaugural season, Bischoff was assigned to AHL affiliate, the Chicago Wolves for his first full professional season in 2017–18.

On July 16, 2019, as a restricted free agent, Bischoff was signed to a three-year contract extension with the Golden Knights.

After missing the entirety of the  season due to a lower body injury, Bischoff opted to remain within the Golden Knights organization, by signing a one-year AHL contract with affiliate, the Henderson Silver Knights, on July 14, 2022.

Career statistics

Awards and honors

References

External links

1994 births
Living people
Bridgeport Sound Tigers players
Chicago Wolves players
Henderson Silver Knights players
People from Cambridge, Minnesota
Ice hockey players from Minnesota
Minnesota Golden Gophers men's ice hockey players
New York Islanders draft picks
Omaha Lancers players
Vegas Golden Knights players